"Dei Sepolcri" ("Sepulchres") is a poem written by the Italian poet, Ugo Foscolo, in 1806, and published in 1807. It consists of 295 hendecasyllabic verses. The carme (as the author defined it) is dedicated to another poet, Ippolito Pindemonte, with whom Foscolo had been discussing the recent Napoleonic law regarding tombs.

The idea behind the poem can be traced to 1804, when the Napoleonic edict of Saint-Cloud was issued. On September 5, 1806, the edict was applied to Italy. In short, it stated that all burials must take place outside the city walls; that, for democratic reasons, the burial monuments must all be of the same size; and that their inscriptions would be controlled by a special commission. The edict's  implementation caused Foscolo to meditate upon the nature and philosophy of death.

Irreligious, Foscolo did not share the view of his fellow poet Pindemonte, who defended the Christian view, as opposed to the new Enlightenment ideas introduced by the French regime. Even so, Foscolo was critical of the decree, mostly for civic reasons; he acknowledges that human beings aspire to transcend death. Tombs, monuments for fallen heroes and virtuous men from the past, may inspire those living today, including artists and poets. He affirmed the value of tombs as memorials to noble souls or bright intellects. Long after the marble monuments are destroyed by time, those memorialized can survive in artworks they have inspired, and can in turn inspire virtue in new generations.

References
 Opere di Ugo Foscolo, a cura di Mario Puppo, Ugo Mursia editore, Milano 1962.
 Storia della Letteratura Italiana; direttori: Emilio Cecchi e Natalino Sapegno, vol. 7. L'Ottocento. ed. Garzanti, Milano, 1969.

External links
 Dei Sepolcri (in Italian)

1806 poems
Italian poems